Plecing kangkung is an Indonesian spicy water spinach dish from the island of Bali and Lombok. Plecing kangkung is made from blanched water spinach leaves (Ipomoea aquatica) and served cold with plecing sambal made from ground red chili pepper, shallot, garlic, bird's eye chili, candlenut, kaffir lime, shrimp paste, salt, and sugar. As a side for the Lomboknese dish Ayam taliwang and Balinese dish Ayam Betutu , plecing kangkung is also usually served with additional ingredients such as bean sprouts, string beans, fried peanuts, and urap's grated spicy coconut dressing.

See also 

 Tumis kangkung
 Urap
 Gado-gado
 Lalap

References

External links 
 Plecing kangkung recipe

Salads
Vegetarian dishes of Indonesia
Vegetable dishes of Indonesia